In molecular biology, group IV pyridoxal-dependent decarboxylases are a family of enzymes comprising ornithine decarboxylase , lysine decarboxylase , arginine decarboxylase  and diaminopimelate decarboxylase. It is also known as the Orn/Lys/Arg decarboxylase class-II family.

Pyridoxal-5'-phosphate-dependent amino acid decarboxylases can be divided into four groups based on amino acid sequence. Group IV comprises eukaryotic ornithine and lysine decarboxylase and the prokaryotic biosynthetic type of arginine decarboxylase and diaminopimelate decarboxylase.

Members of this family while most probably evolutionary related, do not share extensive regions of sequence similarities. The proteins contain a conserved lysine residue which is known, in mouse ODC to be the site of attachment of the pyridoxal-phosphate group. The proteins also contain a stretch of three consecutive glycine residues and has been proposed to be part of a substrate-binding region.

See also
Group I pyridoxal-dependent decarboxylases
Group II pyridoxal-dependent decarboxylases
Group III pyridoxal-dependent decarboxylases

References

Protein domains